Indramani Badoni, also known as the "Gandhi of Uttarakhand," was born on December 24, 1925 in the village of Akhodi, in the princely state of Tehri Garhwal. His mother was Mrs. Kaldi Devi and his father was Mr. Sureshanand. He completed has education in Nainital and Dehradun. He also completed his graduate degree from DAV PG College, Dehradun in 1949.
He married Surji Devi when he was only 19 and went to Bombay in search of livelihood. However, he soon returned. He started his public life in 1953 when Meera Bahan, a Gandhian worker, visited his village.

Political career 
In 1961, he became a village head and afterwards the head of the development block, Jakholi. He was elected as an independent candidate to the Uttar Pradesh Legislative Assembly for the first time from Devprayag in 1967. In 1969, he was elected as an All India Congress candidate, and in 1977, he was elected as an independent candidate to the Lucknow Legislative Assembly. Even during the Janata Party wave of 1977, he won with such a landslide that both Congress and Janata candidates lost deposit.

However, Badoni also faced setbacks in his political career. He lost the election to Govind Prasad Gairola in 1974, and in 1989, he lost the parliamentary election to Brahm Dutt. Despite these setbacks, Badoni was deeply committed to the cause of a separate Uttarakhand state. He was active in the movement for a separate state since 1979 and served as the Vice President of the Parvateey Vikas Parishad.

Struggle for Uttarakhand statehood 

In 1994, Badoni began a fast unto death in Pauri to demand a separate Uttarakhand state. He was eventually put in Muzaffarnagar jail by the government. The Uttarakhand movement took many turns, but Badoni played a central role in it and successfully led the agitators divided among various factions and camps.

Due to his unwavering faith in the non-violent movement and his charismatic but easy-going personality, The Washington Post referred to Badoni as the "Mountain Gandhi." He died on August 18, 1999, at the Vithal Ashram in Rishikesh. Despite the challenges he faced throughout his life, Badoni remains a respected and influential figure in the history of Uttarakhand.

References

People from Tehri Garhwal district
Uttar Pradesh Legislative Assembly

1925 births
1999 deaths